Luca Crosta (born 23 February 1998) is an Italian professional footballer who plays as a goalkeeper for Kategoria e Parë club Dinamo Tirana. He began his career in the youth system of Milan.

Club career

Early life and career
Crosta was born in Milan, and developed his football career in the youth system of his hometown club, A.C. Milan.

Cagliari
He transferred to Cagliari on 8 July 2016. In his first season, he made 13 appearances for Cagliari's Primavera team, and was among the substituteswithout being usedfor 18 Serie A matches, before making his senior debut on 28 May 2017 against his former club in the final match not only of Cagliari's season but also of their Sant'Elia stadium. Cagliari took an early lead, then Crosta made a fine save from Carlos Bacca, and then saved a penalty taken by the same player. Crosta then fouled Bacca to concede a second penalty, from which Gianluca Lapadula equalised for Milan. In the last minute of the match, Fabio Pisacane gave Cagliari the victory and a top-half finish.

The following day, Crosta signed his first professional contract with Cagliari, to run until 2019.

Loan to Olbia
On 17 July 2018, Crosta joined Olbia on loan until 30 June 2019.

Loan to Livorno
On 31 January 2019, Serie B club Livorno announced that they loaned Crosta from Olbia.

Second loan to Olbia and loan to Renate
On 19 July 2019, he joined Olbia on another loan. On 31 January 2020, he moved on loan to Renate.

Alessandria
On 5 October 2020, he joined Alessandria.

International career
In 2013, Crosta played three times for Italy at under-15 level and twice for the under-16 team.

Career statistics

Club
Updated 20 May 2018

References

1998 births
Living people
Footballers from Milan
Italian footballers
Italy youth international footballers
Association football goalkeepers
A.C. Milan players
Cagliari Calcio players
Olbia Calcio 1905 players
U.S. Livorno 1915 players
A.C. Renate players
U.S. Alessandria Calcio 1912 players
Serie A players
Serie C players